At least two ships of the French Navy have been named Boulonnais:

 , a  launched in 1927 and sunk in 1942.
 , a  launched in 1953 and expended as a target in 1994.

French Navy ship names